Lemyra nigrifrons is a moth of the family Erebidae. It was described by Francis Walker in 1865. It is found in India (Sikkim, Assam), Myanmar and Thailand.

References

 

nigrifrons
Moths described in 1865